Vagococcus xieshaowenii is a Gram-positive, coccus-shaped and non-motile bacterium from the genus of Vagococcus which has been isolated from the cloacal of a White-rumped snowfinch from the Tibetan Plateau.

References 

Lactobacillales
Bacteria described in 2020